Trigonotylus is a genus of plant bugs in the family Miridae. There are about 18 described species in Trigonotylus.

Species
Trigonotylus americanus Carvalho, 1957
Trigonotylus antennatus Kelton, 1970
Trigonotylus brooksi Kelton, 1970
Trigonotylus caelestialium (Kirkaldy, 1902) (rice leaf bug)
Trigonotylus canadensis Kelton, 1970
Trigonotylus confusus Reuter, 1909
Trigonotylus doddi (Distant, 1904)
Trigonotylus flavicornis Kelton, 1970
Trigonotylus hawaiiensis (Kirkaldy, 1902)
Trigonotylus longipes Slater and Wagner, 1955
Trigonotylus pulcher Reuter, 1876
Trigonotylus ruficornis (Geoffroy in Fourcroy, 1785)
Trigonotylus saileri Carvalho, 1957
Trigonotylus slateri Carvalho, 1957
Trigonotylus tarsalis (Reuter, 1876)
Trigonotylus tenuis (Reuter, 1895)
Trigonotylus uhleri (Reuter, 1876)
Trigonotylus usingeri Carvalho, 1952

References

Thomas J. Henry, Richard C. Froeschner. (1988). Catalog of the Heteroptera, True Bugs of Canada and the Continental United States. Brill Academic Publishers.

Further reading

Arnett, Ross H. (2000). American Insects: A Handbook of the Insects of America North of Mexico. CRC Press.

Miridae genera
Stenodemini